Fredrika Charlotta Runeberg (née Tengström; 2 September 1807, Jakobstad – 27 May 1879, Helsinki) was a Finnish (Finland-Swedish) novelist and journalist. She was a pioneer of Finnish historical fiction and one of the first woman journalists in Finland.

In her own time, she was mainly known as the wife of her famous husband, poet Johan Ludvig Runeberg. The family lived most of their life in Porvoo, where she created most of her works, including the historical novel Fru Catharina Boije och hennes döttrar (1858). She wrote in Swedish.

Life and career

Born in a bourgeoise family in Jakobstad, Fredrika Tengström lived most of her youth in Turku, the then capital of Finland. She was educated in Anna Salmberg's school for girls in 1824–25. She met her future husband, Johan Ludvig Runeberg, her second cousin, while living with her great uncle Jakob Tengström, Archbishop of Turku, in Pargas, having lost her home in the Great Fire of Turku in 1827. In 1828, she moved to Helsinki, the new capital, with her mother, and married Runeberg in January 1831. The family settled in Porvoo and had seven sons; the only daughter died an infant.

Fredrika Runeberg was the first Finnish author to critically analyze the status of women, at home and in the society. Her oeuvre includes two historical novels: Fru Catharina Boije och hennes döttrar (1858), set in Finland during the Great Northern War, and Sigrid Liljeholm (1862), set in the Cudgel War. She also contributed to various newspapers and magazines, and translated foreign literature and articles, mostly from French, German, and English, into Swedish.

Legacy

Runeberg torte
According to a legend, Fredrika Runeberg is the creator of the famous Finnish pastry, the Runeberg torte, although her recipe is also said to be based upon an earlier recipe by confectioner Lars Astenius from Porvoo. The torte is typically served on Johan Ludvig Runeberg's birthday, on 5 February, which is an established flag flying day in Finland. The torte tradition has spread all over Finland, commemorating the country's national poet.

Home museum
Shortly after her death, the Runeberg family home in Porvoo was made into a museum in 1882, being one of the most popular sights in town.

Fredrika Runeberg Stipendium
Since 1987, the Swedish Cultural Foundation in Finland has awarded the annual Fredrika Runeberg Stipendium in her memory to a "mother of community", i.e. women with political or societal achievements. The laureates include prominent people like Elisabeth Rehn (1996), Märta Tikkanen (2001), Eva Biaudet (2006), and Astrid Thors (2011).

Bibliography
 Fru Catharina Boije och hennes döttrar. En berättelse från stora ofredens tid. Finska Litteratursällskapet, Helsinki 1858.
 Teckningar och drömmar. Theodor Sederholm, Helsinki 1861.
 Sigrid Liljeholm. Theodor Sederholm, Helsinki 1862.
 Anteckningar om Runeberg. Min pennas saga (= Svenska Litteratursällskapet i Finland. Skrifter 310). Mercator, Helsinki 1946 (posthumous). 
 Receptbok (= Svenska Litteratursällskapet i Finland. Skrifter 652). Svenska Litteratursällskapet i Finland, Helsinki 2003,  (posthumous).

References

External links
 
 Fredrika Runeberg by the Society of Swedish Literature in Finland
 Works by Runeberg at Project Runeberg

Further reading  
 
 

1807 births
1879 deaths
People from Jakobstad
Writers from Ostrobothnia (region)
Finnish writers in Swedish
19th-century Finnish women writers
Writers of historical fiction set in the early modern period
19th-century Finnish journalists
19th-century Finnish novelists
Women historical novelists
19th-century Finnish writers
19th-century Swedish women writers
19th-century Swedish writers
Finnish women journalists
19th-century women journalists